Naorem Roshibina Devi is an Indian wushu player who competes in the sanda division.

Early life 
Devi was born in Bishnpur district, Manipur.

Career 
In the 9th Asian Junior Wushu Championships held in Gumi, South Korea, she won a gold medal.

In the 2018 Asian Games, she competed in the Women's sanda 60 kg event. She defeated Mubashra Akhtar of Pakistan in the quarter finals, which assured her a medal. She lost to Cai Yingying of China in the semi-finals, and was jointly awarded a bronze medal.

References 

Indian sanshou practitioners
Martial artists from Manipur
Living people
Year of birth missing (living people)
Asian Games medalists in wushu
Wushu practitioners at the 2018 Asian Games
Asian Games bronze medalists for India
Medalists at the 2018 Asian Games